Balandrau is a  mountain located in the eastern region of the Pyrenees. It separates the valleys of Ribes de Freser and Camprodon, Catalonia, Spain. This mountain lies relatively close to Vall de Núria (Ripollès).

2000 disaster
On December 30th, 2000, a blizzard killed 9 people near Balandrau.

See also
Geology of the Pyrenees

References

External links
 Refugi de Coma de Vaca
Excursions

Mountains of Catalonia
Emblematic summits of Catalonia